The 1981 World Table Tennis Championships women's doubles was the 35th edition of the women's doubles championship.
Zhang Deying and Cao Yanhua defeated Tong Ling and Pu Qijuan in the final by three sets to nil.

Results

See also
List of World Table Tennis Championships medalists

References

-
1981 in women's table tennis